Euryopis argentea is a species of cobweb spider in the family Theridiidae. It is found in the United States, Canada, and Russia.

References

Theridiidae
Articles created by Qbugbot
Spiders described in 1882
Spiders of the United States
Spiders of Canada
Spiders of Russia